was a renowned Japanese photographer. He had a studio at Inabaguchi in Gifu. He experimented with forms, including collages where he used his family as models. He also experimented with chemistry.

References

Japanese photographers
1820 births
1882 deaths
19th-century Japanese people
19th-century photographers